Hajipur, a city and headquarters of Vaishali district, Bihar state, India

Hajipur could refer to: hajipur is near by ganga river. it is famous for its very sweet bananas.

Hajipur, Bihar
Hajipur Junction railway station, zonal headquarter of East Central Railway
Hajipur Nagar Parishad, the municipal organisation and civic agency of Hajipur, Bihar state.
List of villages in Hajipur block, is a list of villages in vaishali district, Bihar state
Hajipur (community development block), district subdivision of vaishali
Export Promotion Park of India, Hajipur, is a multiple - product export processing zone and administrative body of Hajipur, Bihar, India

Places
Hajipur (Meerut), a village in Meerut district, Uttar Pradesh state, India
Hajipur, Punjab, a census town of Hoshiarpur district, Punjab state, India
Behta Hajipur, a census town in Ghaziabad district, Uttar Pradesh state, India
Patli-Hajipur, a village in Gurgaon district, Haryana state, India
Hajipurwadi, a village in Aurangabad district, Maharashtra state, India
Hajipur (Telangana)  a Village and Mandal in Mancherial District, Telangana State, India.
Hajipur, Chhatoh, a village in Raebareli district, Uttar Pradesh, India
Hajipur, Dih, Raebareli, a village in Raebareli district, Uttar Pradesh, India

Politics 
 Hajipur (Lok Sabha constituency), a Lok Sabha constituency in Bihar, India
 Hajipur (Vidhan Sabha constituency), an assembly constituency in Bihar

See also